Carissa (Greek: Καρισσα, also transliterated as Charissa or Karissa) is a feminine given name of Greek origin derived from Greek χαρις (charis) meaning "grace." It can also be translated as "beloved." Coined by English poet Edmund Spenser in his epic poem "The Faerie Queene" (1590).
Related names in other languages include Cara (Irish, Italian), Carys (Welsh), Cherie (French and English), and Cheryl (English).

Carissa is the name of a botanical genus of warm-weather plants.

References

English feminine given names 
Greek feminine given names